In geometry, the great pentagrammic hexecontahedron (or great dentoid ditriacontahedron) is a nonconvex isohedral polyhedron. It is the dual of the great retrosnub icosidodecahedron. Its 60 faces are irregular pentagrams.

Proportions

Let  be the largest positive  zero of the polynomial . Each face has three long and two short edges. The ratio  between the lengths of the long and the short edges is given by
. 
The dihedral angle equals . Part of each face lies inside the solid, hence is invisible in solid models. The other two zeroes of the polynomial  play a similar role in the description of the great pentagonal hexecontahedron and the great inverted pentagonal hexecontahedron.

References

External links 

Dual uniform polyhedra